This list of listed buildings in Østerbro lists listed buildings and structures in the Østerbro district of Copenhagen, Denmark.

List

References

 |Osterbro